MS Antenor was a British bulk carrier, and the fifth of five ships to bear the name. She was built in 1972 at the Fujinagata Shipyards of the Mitsui Shipbuilding and Engineering Company in Osaka, Japan, for Alfred Holt and Company, who owned various shipping lines including the Ocean Steam Ship Company (OSSC) and Blue Funnel Line.

She was powered by an  diesel engine. Her sister ships were MS Achilles (1972), MS Agamemnon (1972), MS Anchises (1973) and MS Ajax (1973). Owned by the Ocean Group, part of Alfred Holt and Company, she sailed from 1972-1977 for Elder Dempster Lines under Blue Funnel colours, and for Blue Funnel Bulkships Limited from 1977-1978.

In 1978 she was sold to Mermaid Sea Carriers Corporation of Liberia and renamed Sideris. She was operated by the Norwegian company Solstad Rederi AS from 1989 as the Solbulk, finally from 1996 under the name Kyklades K by Aldebarran Shipping Limited of Piraeus, Greece.

The ship was broken up at Chittagong, Bangladesh, in 2001.

See also

References

1972 ships
Ships built by Mitsui Engineering and Shipbuilding
Bulk carriers
Merchant ships of the United Kingdom
Ships built by Fujinagata Shipyards